is a city in Tokushima Prefecture, Japan.

Geography
Anan is located in the southeastern part of Tokushima Prefecture and is the easternmost municipality on the island of Shikoku. The east faces the Kii Channel and the Pacific Ocean, and is the northern end of Muroto-Anan Kaigan Quasi-National Park. The city is at the mouth of the Naka River, which is the longest river in the prefecture, and the Kuwano River runs through the city. The city has two main urban centers: the Tokushima district, which is a former castle town, and the Tachibana district, which is a port city.

Neighbouring municipalities 
Tokushima Prefecture
 Komatsushima
 Katsuura
 Naka
 Minami

Climate
Anan has a humid subtropical climate (Köppen climate classification Cfa) with hot summers and cool winters. Precipitation is high, but there is a pronounced difference between the wetter summers and drier winters.

Demographics
Per Japanese census data, the population of Anan in 2020 is 69,470 people. Anan has been conducting censuses since 1920.

History 
As with all of Tokushima Prefecture, the area of Anan was part of ancient Awa Province. The Naka River valley was settled since at least the Kofun period, and archaeologists have found many kofun burial mounds and the traces of Japan's oldest cinnabar mine.  During the Edo period, the area was part of the holdings of Tokushima Domain ruled by the Hachisuka clan from their seat at Tokushima Castle. Following the Meiji restoration, it was organized into 17 villages within Naka District, Tokushima with the creation of the modern municipalities system on October 1, 1889, including the villages of Tomioka and Tachibanaura. Tomioka was raised town status in 1905 and Tachibanaura became Tachibana town in 1912. The two towns merged on May 1, 1958 to form the city of Anan. On March 20, 2006, the towns of Hanoura and Nakagawa (both from Naka District) were merged into Anan.

Government
Anan has a mayor-council form of government with a directly elected mayor and a unicameral city council of 28 members. Anan contributes four members to the Tokushima Prefectural Assembly. In terms of national politics, the city is part of Tokushima 1st district of the lower house of the Diet of Japan.

Economy
Anan was traditionally known for its production of edible bamboo shoots and bamboo products. In modern times, it has been associated with Nichia, a global LED and electronic materials manufacturer which has its headquarters and several factories in the city. Also in the city is the static inverter plant of Kii Channel HVDC system. Agriculture and commercial fishing also play a role in the economy.

Education
Anan has 22 public elementary schools and ten public middle schools operated by the city government and one public middle school and four public high schools operated by the Tokushima Prefectural Department of Education. The prefecture also operates one special education school for the handicapped. The city also has the National Institute of Technology, Anan College.

Transportation

Railway
 Shikoku Railway Company – Mugi Line
  -  -  -  -  -  -  -  -

Highways 
  Tokushima Expressway
  Anan-Aki Expressway

Local attractions
Tairyū-ji, 21st temple on the Shikoku Pilgrimage
Byōdō-ji, 22nd temple on the Shikoku Pilgrimage
Wakasugiyama Site, Kofun period cinnabar mine trace. National Historic Site

References

External links

 Anan City official website 

Cities in Tokushima Prefecture
Port settlements in Japan
Populated coastal places in Japan
Anan, Tokushima